Eight presidents of the United States have made presidential visits to South Asia. The first trip by a sitting president to South Asia was by Dwight D. Eisenhower in 1959. Of the eight countries in the region, only 4 of them have been visited by a sitting American president: Afghanistan, Bangladesh, India and Pakistan. The other four countries, Bhutan (which has no formal diplomatic relations with the US), the Maldives, Nepal and Sri Lanka, have never been visited by a sitting American president.

Table of visits

See also
 Bureau of South and Central Asian Affairs
 Foreign policy of the United States
 South Asian foreign policy of the Barack Obama administration

References

Afghanistan–United States relations
Bangladesh–United States relations
India–United States relations
Maldives–United States relations
Nepal–United States relations
Pakistan–United States relations
Sri Lanka–United States relations
Lists of United States presidential visits